Chinar is a rural locality (a selo) in Derbentsky District of the Republic of Dagestan, located in the southeastern part of the republic,  from the republic's capital Makhachkala and  from Dagestanskiye Ogni, where the nearest railway station is. Population: .

The ethnic composition of the population is mostly Lezgins, Azeris, Dargins.

References

Rural localities in Derbentsky District